The 1989 African Cup of Champions Clubs was the 25th edition of the annual international club football competition held in the CAF region (Africa), the African Cup of Champions Clubs. It determined the 1989 club champion of association football in Africa.

Raja CA from Morocco won that final, and became for the first time CAF club champion.

Preliminary round

|}
1: 
2:

First round

|}

1: 

AFC Leopards won on away goals after 1–1 on aggregate.

Zimbabwe Saints won on away goals after 3–3 on aggregate.

Djoliba AC won 1–0 on aggregate.

Mighty Blackpool won 5–3 on penalties after 1–1 on aggregate.

ES Tunis won 2–1 on aggregate.

Express FC won 5–2 on aggregate.

Fire Brigade SC won 2–0 on aggregate.

Inter Club Brazzaville won 4–3 on aggregate.

Iwuanyanwu Nationale won 4–1 on aggregate.

JAC Port-Gentil won 5–3 on penalties after 1–1 on aggregate.

Mouloudia d'Oran won after Al-Ittihad withdrew.

Nkana Red Devils won 5–2 on aggregate.

Raja won 2–1 on aggregate.

Tonnerre Yaoundé won 5–0 on aggregate.

AS Vita Club won 6–1 on aggregate.

Al-Mourada SC won on away goals after 2–2 on aggregate.

Second round

|}

Al-Mourada SC won 3–1 on aggregate.

Inter Club Brazzaville won 5–4 on penalties after 3–3 on aggregate.

MC Oran won 5–4 on aggregate.

Mighty Blackpool won 2–1 on aggregate.

Nkana Red Devils won 8–3 on aggregate.

Raja won on away goals after 1–1 on aggregate.

Tonnerre Yaoundé won 4–2 on aggregate.

Zimbabwe Saints won 4–3 on penalties after 1–1 on aggregate.

Quarter-finals

|}

MC Oran won 4–1 on aggregate.

Tonnerre Yaoundé won 4–1 on aggregate.

Raja won 2–1 on aggregate.

Nkana Red Devils won 2–1 on aggregate.

Semi-finals

|}

MC Oran won 5–3 on aggregate.

Raja won 4–2 on aggregate.

Final

Champion

Top scorers

The top scorers from the 1989 African Cup of Champions Clubs are as follows:

Notes and references

Notes

References

External links
1989 African Cup of Champions Clubs - rsssf.com

1
African Cup of Champions Clubs